Javier Fernández Fernández (born 7 January 1948 in Mieres, Asturias) is a Spanish politician, mining engineer, and civil servant. He was the secretary general of the Federación Socialista Asturiana, the regional socialist party affiliated with the national Spanish Socialist Workers' Party (PSOE).

Fernández served as the President of the Principality of Asturias from 26 May 2012 to 16 July 2019. He came to power as the result of a coalition government stemming from the 2012 Asturias General Council election held in March. A parliamentary pact was made between the PSOE and the centrist Union, Progress and Democracy (UPyD). Fernández was elected president on 23 May 2012, and took office three days later. He appointed five women and three men to his cabinet, including economist Dolores Carcedo as the Minister of Finance.

He retained the Presidency after the 2015 election, but governing in minority only with the support of the United Left of Asturias.

On 1 October 2016, Fernández was named by PSOE to lead the party's caretaker committee, after the resignation of Pedro Sánchez as secretary general.

References

1948 births
Presidents of the Principality of Asturias
Members of the 6th Congress of Deputies (Spain)
Living people
People from Mieres, Asturias